Benjamin Feigenbaum (August 12, 1860 – November 10, 1932) was a Polish-born Jewish socialist, newspaper editor, translator, and satirist. Feigenbaum was an associate editor of the Yiddish language The Forward, its predecessor Di Arbeter Tsaytung, and the literary monthly Di Tsukunft, co-founder of the Workmen's Circle, and a pioneer of the Socialist Party of America.

Early life 
Benjamin Feigenbaum was born to a prominent Chassidic family in Warsaw, Poland. He went to Yeshivah, but became a free-thinker. According to a colleague, Israel Joshua Singer, Feigenbaum's "conversion" to secularism happened when his teacher, the Gerer rebbe discovered that Feigenbaum was not wearing tsitsit, a ritual garb. The rebbe beat him as a punishment.

After moving to Belgium, he attended his first socialist protest in Antwerp in 1884. On December 25, 1886, his wife Matilda (Kaminsky) Feigenbaum gave birth to their son William Morris Feigenbaum, who later also became a prominent socialist. He had two daughters and two sons, named Kanin, R. Ganetkin, William, and Henry.

Career

London 
As a young socialist in 1887, Feigenbaum considered starting a socialist Yiddish newspaper. To his delight, he discovered the newly created London-based Arbeter Fraynd, contacting them immediately. Towards the end of 1888, Feigenbaum moved to London, UK with his wife, to join their editorial board.

During the Jewish Holiday of Yom Kippur in 1888, Feigenbaum hosted the first public Yom Kippur Ball. In 1889 at another Yom Kippur Ball, Feigenbaum famously declared "If there is a God and if he is Almighty as the clergy claims he is, I give him just two minutes' time to kill me on the spot, so that he may prove his existence!" after two minutes he declared "See! There is no God!". Afterwards he announced a location for the workers to eat instead of fasting, as traditionally done during Yom Kippur.

New York 
In 1891, Feigenbaum immigrated to New York to work on New York's first Yiddish-language socialist newspaper, Di Arbeter Tsaytung (The Workman's Paper). He co-founded the Workmen's Circle, serving as its first general secretary. In New York, Feigenbaum developed a relationship with Bolesław Miklaszewski, a representative of the London affiliate of the Polish Socialist Party (PPS), named the Union of Polish Socialists Abroad (ZZSP). After vetting Feigenbaum's circles to ensure they did not have "a gravitational pull" to Russia, ZZSP announced the creation of a "Jewish Socialist Post from America to Poland" in 1896 to publish and disseminate Yiddish socialist literature.

In 1909, Feigenbaum chaired a meeting on whether to strike, held inside the Great Hall of Cooper Union. After hours and multiple speakers cautioned against striking, a Yiddish-speaking shirtwaist worker named Clara Lemlich made her way to the podium and declared "I move that we go on a general strike!" to which the crowd roared enthusiastically. Feigenbaum asked the crowd to take an biblically inspired oath "If I turn traitor to the cause I now pledge, may my hand wither from the arm I now raise", which subsequently led to the largest women's strike in US history.

Police retaliation 
Feigenbaum was arrested during a brawl with the police on October 29, 1892, shortly after giving a speech in Philadelphia. He was charged with inciting to riot, assaulting an officer and breaching the peace after allegedly hitting an officer with his cane. He was held on $600 bail.

In Providence, he was charged with inciting to riot, charges which were later dismissed by a judge during trial in a higher court. In January, 1905, Providence police received a tip that an "anarchist provocateur" was scheduled to speak. Police surrounded the designated venue, disabled the gas and cited the lack of permit to shut the event down. The sponsors of the lecture, the Providence branch of the Workmen's Circle obtained the relevant permits and scheduled another venue for Feigenbaum to speak at. If Hyman Goldsmith, a Yiddish-speaking undercover police officer heard Feigenbaum mention anything about "Emma Goldmanism" or “bomb throwing” the hall was to be cleared immediately by other undercover police in the crowd. Instead, Feigenbaum orated for two hours and 15 minutes about the compatibility of religion and socialism, in sharp contrast with his past anti-theist recitals. The police were ridiculed the following day by The Daily Journal, The Evening Bulletin, and The Providence Telegram.

Criticism of Zionism and religion 
Feigenbaum was highly critical of Zionism and the usage of biblical scriptures in promoting "socialist spiritualization". In the Yiddish article, 'Materialism in Judaism or Religion and Life' (1896), Feigenbaum criticized using the Bible as "propaganda", noting that if Jeremiah did not know Marx, then it was disingenuous to claim that Marxism is part of a prophetic tradition. In 'Vi Kumt a yid tsu sotsyialismus'''  (How does a Jew come to socialism?), Feigenbaum wrote "Yes, brothers, socialism is redemption for us, the Jews. Socialism will rescue all the unfortunate people, Jews as well, and give them equal rights... Socialism's victory would spell the only effective defeat of the forces of anti-Semitism". He further maintained that he met socialist Gentiles who "ridded themselves of anti-Semitism upon discovering socialism. The enemy is the capitalist, whether Gentile or Jewish; and the Jewish poor are his friend."

Feigenbaum rejected Zionism as utopian and urged Jews to reject the notion of Goles'' as exile from Palestine. Instead, exile should be understood as the state of persecution, from which socialism can redeem them.

Death

Feigenbaum died on the morning of November 10, 1932, at the Home for Incurables in New York. He had been ill for the previous ten years, the last three of which he was paralyzed. Funeral services were held in Forward Hall, on November 13, 1932. Feigenbaum is currently buried in the Workmen’s Circle section of Mount Carmel Cemetery, in Queens, New York.

Written works

Authored

Translated

See also 

 Yiddish literature
 Yiddishist movement
 History of the socialist movement in the United States
Jewish views and involvement in US politics

References

External links 

 Yiddish Book Center links to published works by Feigenbaum, Benjamin

1860 births
1932 deaths
American anti-capitalists
American Marxists
19th-century American memoirists
19th-century American novelists
American political writers
American newspaper editors
American newspaper founders
Yiddish-language journalists
Jewish socialists
19th-century male writers
20th-century male writers
Critics of religions
Jewish activists
Jewish American writers
Jewish American journalists
Jewish American atheists
Jewish philosophers
Libertarian socialists
Polish atheists
Jewish anti-Zionism in the United States
Writers from Warsaw
American socialists
Members of the Socialist Party of America
American satirists
Translators to Yiddish